is a Japanese actress, voice-actress, and singer affiliated with Ken Production. She is known for Minakami Mai in Nichijou, Amano Yukiteru in Mirai-Nikki, and Tobiichi Origami in the Date A Live-series.

Filmography

Anime

OVA / Short film

Video games
Sid Story (Christie)
Alchemist Code (Reida)
Lost Judgment (Mami Koda) 

DubbingBohemian Rhapsody, Roger's Girlfriend 1iCarlyThe Thundermans'', Billy Thunderman

References

External links
 
Official agency profile 

Year of birth missing (living people)
Living people
Anime singers
Japanese women singers
Japanese stage actresses
Japanese video game actresses
Japanese voice actresses
Ken Production voice actors
Singers from Hokkaido
Nippon Columbia artists
Voice actresses from Hokkaido
21st-century Japanese actresses